Paludibacter propionicigenes  is a Gram-negative, strictly anaerobic, non-spore-forming and non-motile bacterium from the genus of Paludibacter which has been isolated from rice plant residue in Yamagata on Japan. Paludibacter propionicigenes produces propionate and acetate from glucose fermentation and is classified as a saccharolytic fermenter.

References

Further reading 
 

Bacteroidia
Bacteria described in 2006